José Julián Sidaoui, born in Puebla in 1953, is a Mexican financier and banker.

He earned a B.A. in economics from the Universidad de las Américas Puebla in 1973, a M.A. in Economics from the department of economics of the University of Pennsylvania in 1974, and a Ph.D. in economics from the George Washington University in 1978.

From 1976 to 1978, he worked at the World Bank as economic researcher in the Latin America and Caribbean area. On December 5, 1994, to December 1996, he was appointed Deputy Minister of Finance. For a time from January 1, 1997, he was Deputy Governor of Bank of Mexico.

Sidaoui has authored several publications on topics such as Structural Change in the Mexican Economy, Manufactured Exports and Macroeconomic Policy. He has taught different subjects in Economics at Universidad Anahuac and at Instituto Politécnico Nacional.

References

1953 births
Living people
People from Puebla
Mexican financial businesspeople
Mexican bankers